Golden Ocean Group is a Bermuda-registered, Norway- based dry bulk shipping company. The company was created as a demerged part of Frontline in 2004 and is listed on Nasdaq and the Oslo Stock Exchange. 42% of the company is owned by John Fredriksen.

The company owns one of the largest dry bulk fleets in the world. 

Management of the fleet is carried out by the Norwegian company Golden Ocean Group Management AS led by CEO Ulrik Uhrenfeldt Andersen

References

External links

Shipping companies of Norway
Dry bulk shipping companies
Shipping companies of Bermuda
Transport companies established in 2004
2004 establishments in Bermuda
2004 establishments in Norway
Companies listed on the Oslo Stock Exchange
Companies listed on the Nasdaq